Nicolas Nunes Ferri (born 23 September 2000), commonly known as Nicolas, is a Brazilian footballer who currently plays as a midfielder for Novo Hamburgo.

Career statistics

Club

Notes

References

2000 births
Living people
Brazilian footballers
Association football midfielders
Esporte Clube Novo Hamburgo players